Beat Zehnder (born 9 January 1966) is a Swiss Formula One engineer. He is currently the sporting director at the Alfa Romeo Racing Formula One team. He has been with the Swiss team since its inception in 1993, and has attended every single race.

Career
Beat Zehnder has been a part of the Sauber family since the 1980s. He started with the Swiss outfit as a mechanic in the early days of the team's partnership with Mercedes Benz, moving from the number two mechanic to the number one in the space of a year. When the team began to concentrate their efforts on launching their own F1 team, he moved across from the mechanics side to work on logistics. However, Zehnder was swiftly returned to his mechanics duties, becoming the team manager and chief mechanic in 1994. In 1995, Peter Sauber asked Zehnder to concentrate exclusively on logistics and team management and thus he became the team manager, which is a role he still holds today, albeit in an evolved form as Sporting Director at the renamed Alfa Romeo Racing. In his current role Zehnder represents the team in discussions with the FIA and sporting working group as well as managing logistics and garage operations. Throughout his time at the Swiss team, Zehnder has mentored many drivers such as Kimi Raikkonen, Felipe Massa, Sebastian Vettel, Robert Kubica and Charles Leclerc.

References

Living people
1966 births
Formula One managers
Formula One engineers
Formula One mechanics